Shreepati Arcade is a residential skyscraper which was completed in 2002. It is located at Nana Chowk, Mumbai, India. Just off Grant Road bridge in the heart of the city of Mumbai.

The building is 153 meters (500 ft) tall and contains 45 floors. There are six Swiss Schindler's lifts, high speed elevators of up to 4 metres per second, which take only 35 seconds to go from Ground to 45th floor. The Fire fighting safety systems within the building are totally automated. It has a sprinkler system, the main and kitchen doors are two hour fire rated and current flows through insulated wires in a 'bus bar' system. The structure is earthquake resistant.

The club house of the Shreepati Arcade is equipped with a swimming pool, gymnasium, steam, sauna & jacuzzi. This building has a residence restriction that all residents must be vegetarian. This kind of practice is not considered unusual in India.

See also

List of tallest buildings in India
List of tallest buildings in Mumbai
List of tallest buildings and structures in the Indian subcontinent
List of tallest residential buildings
List of tallest buildings in different cities in India
India Tower
The Imperial

References

External links
Skyscraper page showing diagrams

Buildings and structures completed in 2002
Residential skyscrapers in Mumbai
2002 establishments in Maharashtra